Events in the year 2003 in Norway.

Incumbents
 Monarch – Harald V
 Regent – Haakon – from 25 November 2003 until 12 April 2004 (during the King's treatment for cancer and the subsequent convalescence period)
 Prime Minister – Kjell Magne Bondevik (Christian Democratic Party)

Events

January

February

March
 19 March – A man dies and four are injured in a blasting accident in Namsos.

April

May

 15 May - Discovery of high levels of chemicals in whale meat leads to pregnant women being warned not to eat it. 

 25 May – After docking in Miami at 05:00,  is severely damaged by a boiler explosion at 06:30, that kills 7, and injures 17 crew members. A few weeks later it is announced by NCL that she will never sail again as a commercial ocean liner.

June

 23 June - World Refugee Day in Norway. UNHCR, together with the Norwegian Refugee Council (NRC), set up a mock refugee camp in central Oslo. A number of activities took place inside the camp.  The NRC, in co-operation with the Norwegian Post, launched a World Refugee Day stamp on June 20.  The Refugee Council invited all ninth-grade students in Norway to participate in an essay and poem competition with the theme, "Refugee Youth". A jury consisting of well-known Norwegian authors chose the best of the contributions, which will be presented in different contexts. Several activities were also launched at refugee reception centres throughout Norway to celebrate World Refugee Day.  The Norwegian Scouts' Association organised a World Refugee Day fund-raising campaign for NRC.

July

August

September
 15 September – Norwegian county council elections, and municipal and county elections are held throughout the country.

October

November

December
 1 December – King Harald V was announced to be suffering from bladder cancer.
 10 December – Shirin Ebadi of Iran receives the Nobel Peace Prize in Oslo, Norway.
 12 December – Keiko, the orca whale who starred in the 1993 film Free Willy, dies of pneumonia while in the Taknes Bay located at the Arasvikfjord in Norway, where he had lived in the recent years.
 December
 Bare på jobb, a Norwegian comedy film is released. at Filmweb.no (Norwegian)
 Plans to explore for oil and gas in the Barents Sea spark criticism from environmentalists and fishing industry.

Popular culture

Sports

Music 
 Norway in the Eurovision Song Contest 2003 
 Norway competed in the Eurovision Song Contest 2003, represented by Jostein Hasselgård with the song "I'm Not Afraid to Move On". The song was chosen as the Norwegian entry for the 2003 contest through the Melodi Grand Prix contest.

Film

Literature

Television

Notable births
 29 April – Maud Angelica Behn, daughter of Ari Behn and Princess Märtha Louise of Norway

Notable deaths

13 January – Andreas Holm, politician (born 1906)
24 January – Rolf Kirkvaag, journalist and radio and television personality (born 1920)
13 February – Axel Jensen, author and poet (born 1932)
3 March – Kitty Petrine Fredriksen, politician (born 1910).
6 March – Claus Helberg, resistance fighter and mountain guide (born 1919)
17 March – Anne-Olaug Ingeborgrud, politician (born 1925)
29 March – Herbjørn Sørebø, media personality (born 1933).
5 April – Sigurd Manneråk, politician (born 1942)
6 April – Ole Otto Paus, General and diplomat (born 1910)
14 April – Olai Ingemar Eikeland, politician (born 1915)
22 April – Ola H. Kveli, politician (born 1921)
9 May – Hans Engnestangen, speed skater and World Champion (born 1908)
14 May – Ingvar Lars Helle, politician (born 1933)
24 May – Arne Skouen, film director and journalist (born 1913)
30 May – Lars T. Platou, electrical engineer and politician (born 1920)
13 June – Tor Stokke, actor (born 1928)
27 June – Magne Aarøen, politician (born 1944)
12 August – Håkon Kyllingmark, politician and Minister (born 1915)
5 September – Harry Hansen, politician (born 1919)
9 September – Otto Lyng, politician (born 1926)
8 October – Petter Thomassen, politician and Minister (born 1941)
24 October – Eva Haalke, ballet teacher and dancer (born 1912).
10 November – Edvard Beyer, literary historian, literary critic and professor (born 1920)
3 December – Kristine Rusten, politician (born 1940)
24 December – Gunnar Alf Larsen, politician (born 1919)

Full date unknown
Harald Magne Elstad, judge (born 1913)

See also

References

External links

 
Norway